Duck is the seventh studio album by English indie rock band Kaiser Chiefs, released on 26 July 2019. It is the follow-up to their 2016 album, Stay Together. It was preceded by the lead single "Record Collection". The album was promoted by a concert at Elland Road on 8 June 2019 to commemorate 100 years of Leeds United F.C.

Background
Frontman Ricky Wilson said that the lead single "Record Collection" is "about the internet and frustration with the internet, about how it rules our lives but we don't really understand what it is and how we just click accept". The song is not to be confused with the title track of Record Collection by Mark Ronson, which was co-written by former Kaiser Chiefs member Nick Hodgson and subsequently covered by the band on triple j's Like a Version segment. The song entered iTunes Charts peaking at number 61 in Spain and 62 in Brazil.

Track listing

Charts

References

2019 albums
Kaiser Chiefs albums
Polydor Records albums